Uruguay competed at the 1988 Summer Olympics in Seoul, South Korea. 15 competitors, 14 men and 1 woman, took part in 14 events in 8 sports.

Competitors
The following is the list of number of competitors in the Games.

Athletics

 Claudia Acerenza

Boxing

 Daniel Freitas
 Juan Montiel

Cycling

Three male cyclists represented Uruguay in 1988.

Men's road race
 José Asconeguy
 Alcides Etcheverry

Men's points race
 Federico Moreira

Gymnastics

 Germán Tozdjian

Modern pentathlon

One male pentathlete represented Uruguay in 1988.

Men's Individual Competition
 Alejandro Michelena — 3790 pts (→ 62nd place)

Men's Team Competition
 Alejandro Michelena — 3790 pts (→ 25th place)

Rowing

 Jesús Posse

Sailing

 Heber Ansorena
 Horacio Carabelli
 Luis Chiapparro
 Alejandro Ferreiro
 Bernd Knuppel

Swimming

Men's 100m Freestyle
 Carlos Scanavino
 Heat – 52.52 (→ did not advance, 39th place)

Men's 200m Freestyle
 Carlos Scanavino
 Heat – 1:51.42 (→ did not advance, 19th place)

Men's 400m Freestyle
 Carlos Scanavino
 Heat – 3:54.86
 B-Final – 3:54.36 (→ 12th place)

Weightlifting

References

External links
 Montevideo.com

Nations at the 1988 Summer Olympics
1988
1988 in Uruguayan sport